Ou Ya (born 14 February 1986 in Baoding) is a Chinese footballer.

Club career
Ou Ya started his professional football career in 2006 when he joined Tianjin Teda for the 2006 Chinese Super League campaign. On 15 October 2006, he made his debut for Tianjin Teda in the 2006 Chinese Super League against Qingdao Jonoon. 
In March 2008, Ou moved to another China League One club Anhui Jiufang.

On 29 January 2014, Ou transferred to another China League One side Hebei Zhongji.

Career statistics 
Statistics accurate as of match played 11 November 2018.

References

External links
 

1986 births
Living people
Chinese footballers
Sportspeople from Baoding
Footballers from Hebei
Tianjin Jinmen Tiger F.C. players
Anhui Jiufang players
Hebei F.C. players
Chinese Super League players
China League One players
Association football goalkeepers
21st-century Chinese people